Mount Emily is a mountain in the Klamath Mountains, southwestern Oregon in the US.

Mount Emily may also refer to:

 Mount Emily (Union County, Oregon), in the Blue Mountains of northeastern Oregon, US
 Mount Emily Park, Singapore